Fabian Baumgärtel (born 7 July 1989) is a German footballer who plays as a left back for Greuther Fürth II in the Regionalliga Bayern.

References

External links

1989 births
Sportspeople from Bamberg
Footballers from Bavaria
Living people
German footballers
Association football defenders
SpVgg Greuther Fürth players
SpVgg Greuther Fürth II players
Alemannia Aachen players
Stuttgarter Kickers players
Hallescher FC players
FC Viktoria Köln players
SV Elversberg players
2. Bundesliga players
3. Liga players
Regionalliga players